Merv Williams (18 December 1937 – 16 November 2014) was an Australian rules footballer who played with North Melbourne in the Victorian Football League (VFL). He transferred to Williamstown in 1961 and played with the Seagulls until the end of 1966, totaling 72 games and 79 goals. He appeared in the losing VFA grand finals of 1961 and 1964 against Yarraville and Port Melbourne, respectively. He was awarded 'Town's best utility player award in 1962 and was later Seconds coach and assistant coach to Ted Whitten in 1975.

Notes

External links 

2014 deaths
1937 births
Australian rules footballers from Victoria (Australia)
North Melbourne Football Club players